Un medico in famiglia (English: A doctor in the family) is an Italian television series, based on the format of the Spanish series of Telecinco Médico de familia, produced by Publispei and Rai Fiction. The series aired for ten seasons on Rai 1 from 6 December 1998 to 24 November 2016. 

Since the first season aired, the series immediately became one of the most famous Italian TV series of all time. In 1999 it won the Best Fiction Award and the Best TV Program of the Year Award, two acknowledgements regularly awarded by the Italian TV networks, and the Telegatto for the Best Italian TV Series.

Premise
The show focuses on the Martini family living in the fictional neighbourhood of Poggiofiorito (literally Flowery knoll), a quiet residential zone in Rome's suburbs. The patriarch is Gabriele "Lele" Martini, a widower doctor who works in an experimental local Community Health Center (ASL in Italian). His father Libero Martini is a marxist retired railway worker who, a widower himself, lives with his son and helps him to take care of his children.

The doctor has three children: Maria, Francesco "Ciccio" and Anna "Annuccia". The family is completed by the extravagant and noisy Southern maid Concetta "Cettina" Gargiulo and by Lele's teen nephew Alberto, who lives with his uncle and cousins while his parents are divorcing. 

Despite its comedic tone, the show sometimes involves serious subjects.

Episodes

Cast and characters

Martini family

Giulio Scarpati (s. 1–2, 6–8, 10; guest s. 3–4) as Gabriele "Lele" Martini, a widower physician who works in an experimental local Community Health Center (ASL).
Lino Banfi (s. 1–6, 8–10) as Libero Martini, a retired railway workers with left-leaning ideals who lives with his son and helps him to take care of his children. He has Apulian origins.
Lunetta Savino (s. 1–5; guest s. 6) as Concetta "Cettina" Gargiulo, a flamboyant maid from Southern Italy who works in Martini's house, soon considered like a mother by Lele's children. She's devoted to the Lady of Carmel and an amateur opera singer.
Margot Sikabonyi (s. 1–9) as Maria Martini, Lele's older daughter who studies medicine and then becomes a physician herself. She's 13 years old at the beginning of the series.
Michael Cadeddu (s. 1–7; guest s. 8 and 10) as Francesco "Ciccio" Martin, Lele's only son. He's 8 years old at the beginning of the first season.
Eleonora Cadeddu (s. 1–10) as Anna "Annuccia" Martini, Lele's younger daughter. She's just 3 years old at the beginning of the first season.
Milena Vukotic (s. 1–10) as Enrica Morelli, Lele's rich and snooty mother-in-law who frequently argues with Libero on how to raise their nephews, although she ends up with marry Libero after her first husband Nicola escapes with a young woman.
Riccardo Garrone (s. 1; guest s. 4) as Nicola Solari, Lele's father-in-law. 
Claudia Pandolfi (s.1–2) as Alice Solari, Lele's first wife's sister who works in a local radio and falls in love with his brother-in-law.
Anita Zagaria (s. 1–7) as Nilde Martini, Lele's sister who runs a restaurant.
Manuele Labate (s. 1–7) as Alberto Foschi, Nilde's only son who lives with his uncle while her parents are divorcing. He's 16 years old at the beginning of the first season.
Domiziana Giovanizzo and Gabriele Paolino (s. 6–10) as Elena and Libero Jr. "Boboò" Martini, the twins born after Lele and Alice's marriage. They make their first apparition on season 6, aged 8.
Flavio Parenti (s. 9–10) as Lorenzo Martini, Lele's cousin who works as a surgeon. He makes his first apparition on season 9.
Riccardo Alemanni (s. 9–10) as Tommaso Martini, Lorenzo's only son. He's aged 15 at the beginning of season 9.

ASL medical personnel

Others

Enrico Brignano (s. 1–2) as Giacinto Diotaiuti, Cettina's first boyfriend who works as a private security guard. In season 3 he breaks up with Cettina and escapes in Calabria, where he marries another woman.
Ugo Dighero (s. 1, 6–8; guest s. 2) as Giulio Pittalunga, commonly called "Uncle Giulio", Lele's best friend. 
Francesco Salvi (s. 3–5) as Augusto Torello, Cettina's boyfriend and then-husband. He works as a funeral entrepreneur. Native of the Northern city of Brescia, he's a stingy and histrionic hard worker.
Beatrice Fazi (s. 5–8) as Carmela "Melina" Catapano, Cettina's cousin. She takes her place as maid once Cettina moves to northern Italy in season 6.

Plot

Season 1 
1998. The Martini family, consisting of Lele Martini, a widowed doctor, and his three children: Maria (13 years old), Ciccio (10 years old) and Annuccia (almost 3 years old) and their sixty-year-old grandfather Libero, former railroads now retired, moves into a new home in Poggio Fiorito, at the gates of Rome. The purchase of the house had been one of the last things decided by Lele together with his now-deceased wife Elena. For the kids the new life in Poggio Fiorito is not easy; everyone is unhappy about leaving their friends and the idea of changing school does not lure them. Maria is especially opposed and suffers much for change until she knows Rebby who will become her best friend. The Martini also assume a home help, Cettina Gargiulo, who initially is posing as a Polish woman, but then reveals her colourful Neapolitan origins. They also welcome Alberto (16 years), son of Lele's sister, Nilde, to give him the serenity that at home he had failed because of his constant bickering parents. To complete the family picture are the relatives of deceased Elena, in particular sister Alice and her parents Enrica and Nicola, very eccentric grandparents who will soon divorce. Then, there are Lele's colleagues: Mariano, Laura, in love with Lele but never reciprocated, Tea, a physiotherapist and Jessica, a nurse and Lele's confidant. To these must be added the receptionist Beppe, to which took over the Tunisian Jonis; There is also the head of the ASL, Giorgio Giorgi, very demanding with the other doctors. In mid-season comes Oscar, who replaces Laura, who has decided to leave because she doesn't resist the suffering of not being able to have Lele all by himself. Oscar is openly gay. In this first series, Lele will have to set aside the past to continue her sentimental life; At first, he is infatuated with the paediatrician Irene, his colleague who places great importance on his career, but soon understands that his heart beats for his sister-in-law, Alice, who will only declare her love only in the last scene of the series. Before Lele declares to Alice, Sergio, her ex-boyfriend, returns. Alice almost marries him, but in the evening of her farewell to the bachelor, she is beaten by a drunk, Sergio, and so she finally decides to leave him. Just this episode will allow Lele to still have a chance with his sister-in-law.

Season 2 
The second season starts with a Lele waiting anxiously for Alice's return from her trip to Africa. The two have to understand if their love can last, and they decide to share, these moments with their family. Their relationship grows, though Alice is initially jealous of Lele's old flame, Clara's a photographer, and will later be distressed by having to take the place of her sister Elena in the family. In the village where the two later marry, Lele reaches Alice on the banks of the lake and says, "You are not taking me away Elena, it's the fate that took her away to me". In the end, the two decide to convey a wedding, and for the occasion will come to witness Giulio, who had moved to Africa. During the honeymoon, Alice has a spontaneous abortion and is told in the hospital that she can no longer have babies. Nilde is pregnant, and in Sanremo, she gives birth to a mulatto child, a son of an unknown man to the Martinis. In honour of his brother, who had been misunderstood, she calls his child Lele Junior. But the problems in Martini's home don't lack: Alice is persecuted by a maniac admirer; Alberto falls into depression after a dramatic road accident where his dearest friend (Adriano) remains paralyzed. Furthermore, the relationship between Cettina and Giacinto is no longer stable. Maria, now sixteen, has to face an important and serious moment in her life. In addition, Dr. Giorgi, after a kidney transplant, dies due to a rejection crisis. In addition to sad events, there is also a lot of fun, especially the final event: Alice, who was pregnant despite the previous diagnosis, is inside a stuck elevator, and there, with the indispensable help of Cettina and Maria, Alice gives birth to the twins who are given the names of Libero and Elena. After this experience, Maria chooses to study medicine to become a specialist in obstetrics.

Season 3 
The third season opens almost three years after the second, with Lele's departure and two twins for Australia, in order to study a new cure for a rare infantile disease. Alice is in Brazil but will soon reach it. The family greets Lele with regret, grandfather Libero has new responsibilities, including managing the family budget, so she decides to rent the room of her son and daughter. Maria, anxious to enrol in the university and attend the courses provided by the faculty of Medicine, meets young surgeon Guido Zanin, from whom he feels immediately attracted, and proposes to become the tenant of his family. Guido is especially fond of the Martini, from whom he draws affection, warmth, respect, emotions he is not used to. Guido, in fact, grew up in an orphanage, having as the only friend Marcello, the impudent son of the guardian. In the end after leaving Carlotta, a fascinating nutritionist with phobias about physical contact with other people, Guido takes a close relationship with Maria, despite the significant age difference. A girl who claims to love him finds it and, with an excuse, jumps on her, causing his departure and the anger of all. But shortly afterwards, Mary and Guido, with good peace of mind, reconcile themselves to wandering eternal love at the railway station before Guido left Rome for not suffering. Ciccio, now a teenager tries to break into the rugby transferring to London but must stop because of a shoulder injury. She also begins to attend the girls. Much room in this series finds the friendship between Jessica and Oscar, and the two sharing the house, drunk, make love. When Jessica gets pregnant, she doesn't know if the child she is carrying is of Oscar or Giovanni, the man who for his love has given up becoming a priest. Oscar renounces to see if he is the father. Cettina find out that Giacinto, without saying anything to anyone, has started a family with a Calabrian woman. After various suffering due to men's, she will know Augusto, a bizarre funeral entrepreneur, with which, after a lot of resistance, will marry at the end in a very animated final quarter of an hour of the series.

Season 4 
The Martini family goes to visit Lele, Alice and their two twins in Australia. After returning from the trip for the family, there will be news. Guido, tired of moving between Rome and Milan and seeing Maria just when she is at home, asks his girlfriend to move in with him. Nest of love for Cettina and Augustus, who after marriage go to live in the house next to that of the Martini, to always stay close to the family. A new character also appears in the series: It's Franco Caselli, a new doctor of the ASL, belonging to an important humanitarian organization: Medici Contro La Guerra (Doctors Against The War), for which Maria falling for, having momentarily breaking up with Guido. Meanwhile, the sixteen-year-old Ciccio gets engaged to Miranda, the daughter of Andrea Biglietti, the new partner of his aunt Nilde. At the end of the series, it will be avoided the danger of her pregnancy. During a regular inspection, at Nonno Libero is diagnosed with a heart problem, which would require open-heart surgery: decides to ask Nonna Enrica to marry him, or so his pension will not go wasted; the two decide to get married, even if the diagnosis was wrong. Soon they really fall in love. In this series there is a fleeting return of Nonno Nicola, confirming his reputation as a playboy. Maria is reconciled with Guido: the two decide to get married, and then go to work in Africa as volunteers doctors account for: Medici Contro La Guerra (Doctors Against The War). A few days before the wedding Guido, unknown to all, a thousand sacrifices, together with those (useless) so as not to close the clinic, bought the old house where Mary was born and raised and where he had lived before going to Poggio Fiorito. Maria had shown the house before their quarrel, one morning while they were going to work with the scooter. The season ends with Lele returning from Australia after four years of absence: the situation is a bit 'changed, his father was married to his mother-in-law, his daughter is about to marry a man he has never seen but which he has only heard about and especially: Annuccia has gotten young adult and more autonomous.

Season 5 
Another two and a half years have passed: the new family doctor is Emilio Villari, promising the groom of the grandson of an old suitor and cousin of grandmother Enrica. The main love story will be between him and Dr. Sarita's an Indian doctor. Lele is again absent because he moved to Paris where he worked at the Sorbonne. The series opens with Nilde's boyfriend, Andrea Biglietti, in jail. Andrea was cheated and to save him Libero and Nilde decided to sell the villas in Poggio Fiorito that he had bought. The villas will be sold to Martini's friends, including many of the physicians remaining in the cast, and one will become the new police clinic. Poggio Fiorito becomes autonomous municipality and Grandfather Libero is elected mayor. Alberto and Eloisa break up and the boy returns home. To raise the morale of the boy will prove to her father, Carlo Foschi, with whom Alberto initially has no good relationship since he had mysteriously abandoned him and his mother. Having learned of his father's bad health, Alberto manages to relaunch relationships with him, making his final days better. Cettina realized her desire to give birth to a child named Eros, but the love for Torello seems to be over, because of the arrival of Indian Kabir. In fact, the calm of Poggio Fiorito is disturbed by the arrival of this Indian family composed of grandfather and grandchildren (including Sarita), who will become great friends of Maria, Ciccio and Annnuccia. The family opens an ethnic restaurant in the house that in the previous season had been rented from Torello to Guido and Maria as a nest of love. Once known that Kabir does not reciprocate his feelings, Cettina moves to Pescara with her son, taking distances both from Kabir and Torello and working for the L'agenzia di Pompe Funebri dei Fratelli Zinco (Zinco Brothers Funeral Service). The consequence is that Torellhonor ends up on the brink of bankruptcy. The love story between adolescents Ciccio and Miranda continues. A new entry comes and is the cousin of Cettina, Melina, who will replace her as a home help of the Martini family. Melina will try to seduce Torello, husband of her cousin Cettina, but in the end, she will remain alone. While Guido is still in Africa, Maria returns to Rome and decides to go to live at her friend Rebby, hiding her presence at her family. Once discovered by his grandfather, the girl returns to the Martini's home, where she will tell the tragic story that led her to return to Rome. Waiting for her thesis, Maria finds work as a waitress at the Kabir Indian Restaurant and tightens a strong friendship with Sarita, who will give her some valuable advice. The series concludes with the reconciliation between Sarita, who had risked marrying an impostor, and Emilio, while Torello returned with Cettina. Alberto and Rebby get together.

Season 6
Dr. Lele Martini has been 50 years old and is a well-respected university professor at the Sorbonne where he also published a book about environmental medicine. He was separated from his second wife, Alice, who, for work reasons, entrusts him for a year with the nine-year-old twins: Libero Junior (nicknamed Bobò, for not, be confused with his paternal grandfather), and Elena. It's late summer, and Lele and the twins are about to return to Italy to attend the wedding of Ciccio and Miranda. Libero is no longer the mayor of Poggio Fiorito, and has inherited a farmhouse in Puglia, where Ciccio plans to work together with Miranda, Aunt Nilde, Andrea and his cousin Lele Jr. This project can also be achieved thanks to ' Economic help of Lele and grandmother Enrica. Maria, who is pregnant by Guido, is going to specialize in Infantile Neuropsychiatry and will win a competition to work at the Oscillation Clinic. Giulio Pittaluga returned to Italy after having volunteered in Africa, and following his father's example, he opened a chocolate shop where Kabir's restaurant was once, and he lived in Poggiofiorito. This season there must be a marriage between Ciccio and Miranda, but the girl leaves Ciccio at the altar. From the Netherlands comes Bianca, helping to help Brother Giulio, who is admitted to Oscar's clinic and Guido for back problems. Lele does not recognize her because she has become much more beautiful: at the time of school she was nicknamed "Barilotto" (nickname due to the fact, that at school she was an overweight girl) . After completed her studies, Bianca moved to the Netherlands where she had a daughter named Inge; At first, she doesn't tell Lele that he is engaged to Hans, a Dutch lawyer; For this Lele kisses her. Lele feels the need to stay with his family from which he has been away for many years, furthermore, he realizes that Libero and Enrica can no longer care for the family alone; in fact, if Ciccio is upset after the end of his engagement, on the other hand, Annuccia is no longer a nice and careless little girl: now she is a 13-year-old teenager restless with the turmoil and the problems of his age. Lele, therefore, decides to take a sabbatical year: so also Elena and Bobò will live at Martini's home, and they will finally be close to the three brothers Maria, Ciccio and Annuccia. The whole family welcomes this news, including Libero, who can now accept Nilde's proposal: he will take care of the farmhouse in Puglia, but of course he will not abandon the rest of the family. The problem now is to convince Enrica, who understands the needs of her husband and agrees to move with him. In the clinic founded by Guido and Oscar, Max paediatrician is also working, who from the fifth season is engaged with Oscar, the former Maura banker, who first makes the switchboard and then deals with the administration and Tea, midwife and physiotherapist who has filed His career as a writer. Lele and Maria and Dante Piccione, the former tenant of Guido and Maria now engaged with Melina as a controller, and Fanny and Davide as doctors will later be hired in the clinic. Fanny falls in love with Lele, and when she meets Bianca at Martini's house, she understands she has a rival in love. Also arrives in Rome Ave Battiston, Guido's biological mother; Had abandoned his orphanage son the same day he was born and now he would like to retrieve the relationship with him. Initially, Guido doesn't accept her and can not even call her "Mom", but after the birth of her daughter Palù, Guido relegates her relationship with her mother. This season, Cettina reappears, all believed to have died in a shipwreck, but actually became a billionaire thanks to a chain of restaurants in the Pacific. She has lost her memory and does not remember anything about the Martini, Torello and Eros, but her family life will make her remember everything and make her return to Brescia from her husband and son. Because of the birth of Palù, Maria begins to exclude Guido refusing even to celebrate with her their seventh wedding anniversary. So her husband, in a crisis, betrays her with a hostess known before. When Mary finds out, she decides to seek separation, but eventually, she realizes that Guido is pardoning and renting a camper for the journey of their dreams. In the last episode, Libero and Enrica decide to marry (their first marriage was in fact declared invalid), and Ciccio, having fought any doubt about the end of her story with Miranda, will make the big step by marrying Tresy. The two couples will marry together through civil ceremonies and marry them will be Lele, who after finding Bianca, due to the disappearance of Bobo and the escape to Rome of Inge, finally asks her to marry him getting a positive response. Julius, who left for the reality show, "L'Isola dei Coraggiosi" (The Island of the Brave), who has won, learns that Irma, her old flame with which she has braided a new relationship, is pregnant and then decides to put her head in place and marry her. Even Dante, who couldn't marry Melina, fearing losing the legacy of Uncle Alvise, when she finds out that her old uncle married her caretaker to death, leaving everything to her, decides to conjure up a wedding with her girlfriend.

In the narrative bracket, between the current and the next season, we found out, that Guido is dead due to a car accident.

Season 7
Three years have passed since Guido's accident, in which the doctor lost his life, unfortunately soon after the Martini reconciliation at the end of the sixth season (in 2009). Maria, thanks to the help of her large family, resumes her work and talks to her daughter Palù. But for her and Ave to return to normal life is not easy. Ave also learns that his son's heart has been transplanted to the son of a dance teacher. Thanks to Enrica, the young Martini will know Marco, a single journalist and dad of a little Palu's companion, Jonathan. There will often be misunderstandings between them, which will lead them to question their relationship. Also appears as the figure of Francesco, a psychologist, who falls in love with Maria and who will be in the relationship between her and Marco. Lele again asks Bianca to marry him, but the woman is waiting for documents from her ex-husband. This is how Gus comes in, who will try to relaunch relationships with his wife and hinder her wedding with Lele. To complicate the affair, Virginia appears, a doctor who collaborates with Lele on experimenting with a drug, as well as her ex-flame during the time Lele taught at the Sorbonne in Paris. Ciccio and Tresy after marry are going to live together in a home next to their riding, and it is here that they live the first couple problems: she wants to continue her profession and go ahead with her hockey career as he would like Put on family. So Ciccio, in order to persuade her, finds Tresy's family that the young man has not seen for so long and will not complicate the life of the two; While trying to persuade her to have a son but, at the proposal of a horse race, she renounces her pregnancy; Only later Tresy and Ciccio will reconcile and will want a family again. Meanwhile, the fifteen-year-old Annuccia becomes an institute representative and achieves an incredible success among his comrades. His story with Gianfilippo wavered, but at the end of a school musical the two will come together, and at Lele's and White's wedding in the cottage, they will love for the first time. Meanwhile, Rebby returns from Milan and becomes acquainted with Albina who becomes one of her best friends. Even Alberto, nephew of Martini and Rebby's boyfriend, after being fired, returns to Rome in search of work and falls in love with Albina. Taken in her real estate agency, she takes up a clandestine relationship, quickly unmasked. To Rebby Consul, however, there will be Francesco, the psychologist in love with Maria. Maria and Albina come back to friends and she lives in Puglia with Alberto. The two grandmothers, Enrica and Ave, purchase the villa near Martini, once inhabited by Cettina, and they are both launched in the world of commerce: the first one is the company Puglia D.O.P., specialized in the production of Apulian Masseria products; The second instead produces bridal dresses. The litigation between the two will often be switched on and moved by the unexpected incursion into their Donato home, a cheerleader who is near Ave and encourages him to move on. Dante and Melina also decide to get married. So the poor man will find other jobs to round up the marry for marriage that will prove to be very profitable, but will trigger the jealousy of the Martini home help. In the last episode, Giulio suddenly becomes a wedding organizer and convinces Lele and Bianca to marry in the mountains. Meanwhile, Melina discovers she is pregnant and decides to marry Dante. Bianca also finds out to wait for a son, and when they go to the ultrasound they meet Ciccio and Tresy who tell the couple to wait for two twins. Marco must leave for Frankfurt with his son and his ex-wife. Before leaving with the whole family for the wedding, Palu convinces Mary to go to the airport to give a final greeting to Jonathan and her father, but they arrive too late. The Martini family is found in the mountains, as usual Giulio's plans go into smoke and Lele is lost. Shortly afterwards Lele manages to reach Bianca to marry her; The real shot is Marco's arrival with his son: the reporter has decided not to leave anymore, declaring to Mary her love for her, with a nice kiss. Even Lele and Bianca are finally able to get married. The episode ends with a final waltz of the entire Martini family on the notes of the famous Italian song: " Parlami d'amore, Mariù " (Tell me about love, Mariù), in honour of Carlo Bixio, the creator of the television series.

Season 8 
The season opens a few months after the end of the previous one, with the return of Grandfather Libero from the United States to Martini's home, which is surrounded by the arrival of new children. As already revealed at the end of the previous season, Bianca is expecting a baby from Lele, Ciccio and Tresy are close to being twin parenting parents, and for Dante and Melina is also coming a baby girl named Aurora. With the family reunited, Marco and Maria reveal their intention to get married. The joy of the announcement, however, is interrupted by a recommendation that Lele receives at the beginning of the first instalment in which he finds out that his family and all the residents of Poggio Fiorito have been victims of a real estate scam and are at risk So losing their homes, which they have never been to, even if the fraudster owner was arrested. Initially hiding the news to Marco and Maria, to prevent the two from cancelling the ceremony, Lele decides with her crowded family to roll up her sleeves and do anything to save her home from the clutches of Fulvio Magnani, a scrupulous entrepreneur Who decided to buy the houses of Poggio Fiorito to create a luxurious area. When both Marco and Maria discover the situation, they decide to postpone the wedding until the whole thing is resolved. White to help her husband decide to make a culinary television program, receives the visit of her mother Gemma, with whom she has always had stormy relationships, as she has always worked in front of her children. The love of Maria and her new partner, will, however, be put to the test by the new work that is proposed to the journalist away from her and from the arrival of Roberto Magnani (son of the entrepreneur Fulvio), an old schoolmate of the young Martini, who falls in love with her, madly. To complicate, even more, the already very poor situation of Dr. Martini, there are also the two new owners of Villa Aurora, Guenda Pacifico and Tiziano Corradi, who have an idea, of a health profession far beyond from the doctors of the clinic, doing lose patience, of Lele and Oscar. Ave, on the other hand, also decides, taking part in all the family's affairs, to give a hand to the Martini, going to live in the attic of Bianca's chocolate and starting production of valuable garments. Guenda Pacifico will also become the lover of Gus, former husband of Bianca, Inge's father. Maria will lose her job but Roberto will offer her an apartment in the condominium where she works, so she can open her private studio and then return to the clinic at the end of the season when Guenda gets good thanks to a mini medical revolt and Gus. The relationship between Mary and Mark crumbles since she finds out that Marco went to Somalia for a business trip, pretending Mary to be in Brussels. Maria, shocked by the news, will abandon himself in the arms of his old high school friend, Roberto, with whom he will betray Marco. Magnani to fascinate Mary makes her ride on a helicopter driven by him; She will have to meet at Marco because her former Micol wants to take her daughter away to revenge on what happened in the seventh season, but when Roberto, who wants Maria for him all, offers Micol a job London, she accepts, leaves the ex-husband to her son definitively and will never again be done for revenge. Annuccia is 16 years old, who now goes by the name of Anna. Anna falls in love with a boy, who works as a tattooer and that it is older than her, who she meet casually. Each time Anna skips the school to spy on this boy in his tattoo shop, this is why he is at risk of busting, but with the help of his grandparents, she will be able to make a good assessment of the story and not be thrown away. Then Grandfather Libero and Grandma Enrica leave for Puglia for a rest. In addition, Ave, after the end of his short story with Donato, will find a new love in Armando, a Colonel of the Financial Guard, with whom, however, will have difficult relationships when he remedies money for Martini to produce false dresses Gattinoni. Armando understands the situation and forgives it and, in a legal way, does not stop it; So the two will meet and officially cheer. In the penultimate episode, all seems to be resolved to the best because Lele managed to recapture the house with the money remitted in Paris thanks to the transmission of Bianca, while Maria, after clarifying her doubts will return from Marco. The latter thing wounds Roberto who will be deployed on his father's side to destroy the house. After the workers and Magnani, in the last instalment, will take the current and the next water and gas, the Martini make the complaint, but Lele receives a letter saying that the house, even though it has been repaid, will still be able to owned Magnani legally, but without being knocked down, but removing gas, water and the rest and transforming it into another type of building, such as luxury stores. Then the Martini decide to leave not to see the horror, but before they want to arrange a last surprise wedding for Marco and Maria, who, however, immediately come to know. Antonia, Marco's beloved journalist, understands, as a good girl, Marco's love for Maria and accepts a job she has just offered Marco from New York. While in the home there is the civil marriage of Maria and Marco served by Ave, there is a noise. Magnani, with a scraper, is about to break the house. Roberto, threatened by Armando, who was informed by Martini, reveals everything. The fiendish Fulvio Magnani then tries to break down the Martini who came to him to stop everything, but right in time, Armando comes with his fellow financiers, who after arresting Roberto will also stop and arrest his father Fulvio. As they move away from the scraper and the workers, the Martini are happy to rescue and celebrate the home. The series ends with the return to Grandpa Libero and Grandmother Enrica, the marriage of Maria and Marco, who later leave on their wedding boat with their children's, with the promise of engagement to Armando for Ave, and with the birth of Carlo Martini, son of Lele and Bianca.

Season 9 
After the end of the events of the eighth season, a year later, the Martini house, has been emptied of some of its inhabitants: in fact, Lele and Bianca moved with the little Carlo, Inge and Gus in Paris; Dante and Melina went to live in Sulmona, Anna went to study in London. Grandfather Libero and Enrica are now stationary in Rome, stop travelling between the capital and the farmhouse in Puglia, and with the help of Ave manage family affairs. New characters are ready to animate the villa of Poggio Fiorito: this is Lorenzo Martini, grandson of Libero (son of the Italian-American brother of Libero Achille as well as Lele's cousin) arriving from New York and Sara Levi, sister of Marco (Maria's second husband). The first is a famous surgeon, returning to Rome to recover the relationship with his former wife Veronica, and his fifteen-year-old son: Tommaso (Tommy). The second is a famous athlete, coming also from the United States (where he had gone for an important race) to marry in Rome. Fate has it that the two boys meet on the plane and who, for various vicissitudes that much innervosiranno the young Martini, are found to travel in the same car to Rome, where both are headed. Precisely thanks to that encounter, Sara understands that she is not really in love with the man he is about to marry, leaving him on the altar. The two later discovered they were roommates and with time they began to become confident, until the arrival of the passion. In the life of Sarah, however, Stefano, a fascinating boyfriend who helps her in the management of the open bar replacing the Pittaluga chocolate, comes in, and Veronica continues to undermine the happiness of her ex-husband. Sara also suffers from a congenital malformation of the heart and it is Lorenzo operate on her for saving her life, after putting aside his fear of work (he had a shock in the days when he worked in America). Sara and Lorenzo eventually get married. With the arrival of Lorenzo at home Martini also comes his son Tommy that triggers quite a few jealousies between Elena Martini (now fifteen) and Giada, a fifteen-year-old Albanian girl who lived on the street and that Mary decides to help and entertain at home Martini. Giada arrived in Italy to find her mother and her brother, whom she had no news of for a year. It ends up in the clutches of two baldness that force her to steal while having information about her family. With the help of Martini, the young man succeeds in getting out of this situation but discovers that the mother is dead and that her brother has been adopted. Jade, in spite of the love that binds him to Tommy, prefers to move to Udine along with the family of the rediscovered brother. Anna and Emiliano are in crisis: the girl in fact met in London with Kevin for which she lost her head, and Emiliano after being left, begins to have drug problems. After several wrongs and misunderstandings, love returns between this two. Meantime, Maria, after discovering with such joy that she is pregnant with two twins, decides with her husband Marco, to move to Turin where both have found important business opportunities. Their children's Palù and Jonathan initially live with their grandparents in Rome, and then move to Turin with their parents and Ave.

Season 10 
The tenth season starts in Puglia, where Lele returns after being a year in Paris with Bianca and Carletto; The Martini are all on holiday in the grandfather's villa. There is a new character, Maddalena, whom Father Gennaro entrusts to his grandfather. The new entry will return to Poggio Fiorito along with the whole family and stay in the villa with them. When the Martini return to Poggio Fiorito, a new character comes in, looking for Elena Martini (Lele's first wife) and then she will find out she is Anna's father. The girl becomes big, in fact, the series celebrates her eighteenth birthday. He does the test for admission to the faculty of Medicine that does not exceed him and discovers an unprecedented passion for music thanks to Valerio Petrucci, his natural father, and songwriter Geko, with whom he starts a relationship, albeit not officially. Sara and Lorenzo want to buy a new home and in fact look for an architect, who will be Andrea, who spent a loving night with Sara. But Lorenzo also has an admirer, Dr. Celeste Di Maio, his assistant. Comes to Rome Agnese, Oscar's daughter, passionate about photography, and will have a strange friendship with Tommy, who at the beginning of the season will be rejected and Agnese will give him repeats. The boy, meanwhile, begins to attend Margot, a Graffiti girl and a little wanderer, whom he will fall in love with. Elena, however, is engaged with Tito's schoolmate, who then finds out to be cardiopathic, but thanks to Lele's help, Oscar, Lorenzo and other Aurora physicians work it and after a few weeks get back into shape. Sara has found work as a Coach, for the Volleyball Team, at the School, which will lead to victory. Anna will discover that she is Valerio's daughter, only the day after her birthday when Lele tells her in a car wash. Emiliano shows up, after escaping from the reception center in Paris. Maddalena is a girl who is not interested in love because her husband Rocco had betrayed her on their own honeymoon, but that would change her mind thanks to the plumber Augusto, called by the Martini to build the second bathroom. Bobo will win the first prize of a Race with his Drone, from the many vicissitudes. In the last episode, Marco returns to help Sara, being pregnant and separated to Lorenzo, who asks Sarah of her son, but Marco gives him a punch. Anna will return home with Lele and get back together with Emiliano, after he confesses to still love her, and even leaving Genevra, the girl with whom he was dating, and with whom he worked. Lorenzo and Sara, who won a racing race, come back together and discover that she is even pregnant with their baby. Tommy, abandoned by Margot in Berlin, will flirt with Agnese, disappointed after receiving a rejection of his love from the photography professor, who instead will start a relationship with his father, Oscar. Maddalena and Augusto announce their wedding and Bianca returns from Paris with Carlo to happily celebrate, along with all Martini family, Emiliano and Valerio Petrucci, the new year.

References

1998 Italian television series debuts
2016 Italian television series endings
Italian medical television series
1990s Italian drama television series
2000s Italian drama television series
2010s Italian drama television series
Italian television series based on Spanish television series
RAI original programming